Pampanga's 1st congressional district is one of the four congressional districts of the Philippines in the province of Pampanga. It has been represented in the House of Representatives of the Philippines since 1916 and earlier in the Philippine Assembly from 1907 to 1916. The district consists of the independent city of Angeles, the adjacent city of Mabalacat, and the municipality of Magalang. It is currently represented in the 18th Congress by Carmelo B. Lazatin II of the PDP–Laban and Lingap Lugud Capangpañgan.

Representation history

Election results

2022

2019

2016

|-
|
|colspan="6"| Lingap Lugud gain from KAMBILAN
|-

2013

2010

See also
Legislative districts of Pampanga

References

Congressional districts of the Philippines
Politics of Pampanga
1907 establishments in the Philippines
Congressional districts of Central Luzon
Constituencies established in 1907
Constituencies established in 1987
Constituencies disestablished in 1972